Lochmodocerus antennatus is a species of beetle in the family Cerambycidae, and the only species in the genus Lochmodocerus. It was described by Burne in 1984.

Lochmodocerus antennatus was discovered in Chiapas, Mexico, and is characterized by having conspicuous zones of long, erect setae on the basal portion of some of the segments of the antennae in both sexes.

References

Lamiini
Beetles described in 1984